Hindush (Old Persian cuneiform: 𐏃𐎡𐎯𐎢𐏁, transcribed as  since the nasal "n" before consonants was omitted in the Old Persian script, and simplified as ) was a province of the Achaemenid Empire in lower Indus Valley established after the Achaemenid conquest circa 500 BC. According to the ancient Greek historian Herodotus, it was the "easternmost province" of the empire. It is believed to have continued as a province until the invasion of the empire by Alexander the Great circa 326 BC.

Name 

It is also transliterated as  since the nasal "n" before consonants was omitted in the Old Persian script, and simplified as ).

The Proto-Iranian sound change *s > h occurred between 850–600 BCE, according to Asko Parpola.

The Greeks of Asia Minor, who were also part of the Achaemenid empire, called the province 'India'. More precisely, they called the people of the province as 'Indians' The loss of the aspirate  was probably due to the dialects of Greek spoken in Asia Minor. Herodotus also generalised the term "Indian" from the people of Hindush to all the people living to the east of Persia, even though he had no knowledge of the geography of the land.

Geography 
The territory of Hindush may have corresponded to the area covering the lower and central Indus basin (present day Sindh and the southern Punjab region of Pakistan). Hindush bordered Gandāra (spelt as Gaⁿdāra by the Achaememids) to the north. These areas remained under Persian control until the invasion by Alexander. Alternatively, some authors consider that Hindush may have been located in the Punjab region.

Hindush in the Achaemenid army

According to Herodotus, the 'Indians' participated to the Second Persian invasion of Greece circa 480 BCE. At the final Battle of Platea (479 BCE), they formed one of the main corps of Achaemenid troops (one of "the greatest of the nations"). Indians were still supplying troops and elephants for the Achaemenid army at the Battle of Gaugamela (331 BCE). They are also depicted on the Achaemenid tombs of Naqsh-e Rostam and Persepolis.

Representatives of Hindush are depicted as delegates bringing gifts to the king on the Apadana staircases, and as throne/ dais bearers on the Tripylon and Hall of One Hundred Columns reliefs at Persepolis
The representatives of Hindush (as well as Gandara and Thatagus) in each in- stance are characterized by their loincloths, sandals, and exposed upper body, which distinguish them from the representatives of other eastern provinces such as Bactria and Arachosia.

See also
Achaemenid conquest of the Indus Valley
India (Herodotus)

References

Achaemenid satrapies